Where I Come From may refer to:

Where I Come From (New Riders of the Purple Sage album), 2009
"Where I Come From" (Alan Jackson song), 2000
Where I Come From (Christy Moore album), 2013
"Where I Come From" (Montgomery Gentry song), 2011